British Pobjoy Mint is a privately held company-sector mint located in Surrey, England, which produces commemorative coins, medal, tokens and bullion. The mint also manufacturers circulating currency for some British Overseas Territories and sovereign countries including Sierra Leone and Vanuatu.

History
The mint was founded in 1965 by Derek Pobjoy who purchased a coin press after leaving his father Ernest Pobjoy's jewellery and masonry business to set up a mint. Upon the death of Winston Churchill in the same year the small mint produced a series of gold medals to commemorate coins.

Since 1974, the mint has become involved in the production and international sale of new-issue postage stamps and currently exclusively coordinates the coin and stamp programmes of seven countries (Ascension Island, Bahamas, British Antarctic Territory, British Virgin Islands, Falkland Islands, South Georgia and South Sandwich Islands and Tristan da Cunha).

As manufacturers of gold chains, gilt and enamel badges and escutcheons, regalia and insignia of all kinds, the Pobjoy Mint has been contractor to the British Crown Agents and various London jewellers, for whom it has executed commissions involving precious metals and gemstones of all kinds.

Numismatic developments
In the 1970s, the company developed a new metal alloy similar to German silver known as Virenium which consisted of 81% copper, 10% zinc and 9% nickel. This alloy has been used in non-circulating commemoratives since 1978.

In 1983, the company also created the Manx noble, a bullion coin containing one troy ounce of platinum. It was the first investment coin to be made from 0.9995 fine platinum.  Its production ran for six years from 1983 to 1989.  The noble has legal tender status although, like the South African gold Krugerrand, its value is defined only by its precious metal content as it has no numismatic value. 

The mint also produced the Isle of Man's angel gold coin, from 1984 to 2016. In 1999, Pobjoy Mint issued the world's first titanium coin, the 1999 Gibraltar Millennium £5 coin.

Countries and governments
The Pobjoy Mint has struck non-circulating (commemorative), circulating and pattern coins for nearly 20% of the world's governments and central banks as well as undertaking sub-contracted work for certain national mints. Many medallion issues have also been produced, notably for Hong Kong, Malaysia and the Arab States. The mint has produced eighty different medallions for the World Wide Fund for Nature collection.

The mint has struck coins for the following territories

 Ascension Island
 Bolivia
 Bosnia & Herzegovina
 British Antarctic Territory
 British Indian Ocean Territory
 British Virgin Islands
 Burundi
 Cook Islands
 Eritrea
 Ethiopia
 Falkland Islands
 Fiji
 Gambia
 Gibraltar
 Guinea
 Hong Kong
 Isle of Man – Ended in 2017
 Kyrgyzstan
 Liberia
 Macau
 Malaysia
 Nigeria
 Niue
 Peru
 Philippines
 Pitcairn Islands
 Saint Helena
 Senegal
 Seychelles
 Sierra Leone
 Solomon Islands
 Somaliland
 South Georgia and the South Sandwich Islands
 Spain
 Tajikistan
 Tanzania
 Tokelau
 Tonga
 Tristan da Cunha
 Uzbekistan
 Vanuatu
 Western Samoa

References

External links 

Mints of the United Kingdom
Financial services companies established in 1965
1965 establishments in England
Companies based in Surrey
Mints (currency)
Design companies established in 1965